The Serra Dourada State Park is a state park in the state of Goiás, Brazil.

Location

The Serra Dourada State Park is in the northwest of Goiás, divided between the municipalities of Buriti de Goiás, Mossâmedes and the city of Goiás.
It is on top of a mountain range, and can be reached with a four-wheel drive car.
Within the park the trails are level and lead to interesting rock formations called "stone cities" surrounded by typical cerrado vegetation.

History

The Serra Dourada State Park was established in 2003. It included 188 properties.
A 2008 thesis on sustainable ecotourism in the park found that nothing had been done following the decree creating the park. 
Although there was large potential, there was no management plan and no environmental education for visitors.

According to a consultant for the Federation of Agriculture and Livestock of Goiás, "the park exists only on paper, was created without the studies required by the legislation, and to this day no one knows where it begins and where it ends.
The vice-president of the Goiás branch of the Association of Brazilian Geographers (AGB-GO) said the proposal made no sense when efforts were being made to preserve what was left of the cerrado and even to recover degraded areas.

Notes

Sources

State parks of Brazil
Protected areas established in 2003
2003 establishments in Brazil
Protected areas of Goiás